Warwick-on-Eden is a small village and (as just Warwick) a former civil parish, now in the parish of Wetheral, in the Carlisle district of the county of Cumbria, England. In 1931 the parish had a population of 269. On 1 April 1935 the parish was abolished and merged with Wetheral.

Location
It is located on the River Eden and also near the River Irthing and is on the A69 road about seven miles from Carlisle and about seven miles from Brampton.

Other nearby settlements
Other nearby settlements include the villages of Wetheral, Warwick Bridge, Scotby and Aglionby.

Amenities
The community was served by two places of St Leonard's Church and St. Paul's Church, however, St Leonard's Church has since closed (with the building up for sale)

See also

Listed buildings in Wetheral

References

External links 

 Cumbria County History Trust: Warwick (nb: provisional research only – see Talk page)
 Visitcumbria.com
 Lakedistrictdirectory.co.uk

Villages in Cumbria
Wetheral